The Student Center is a building on the Seattle University campus, in the U.S. state of Washington.

The building houses Counseling and Psychological Services as of 2017, and the Wellness and Health Promotion Center as of 2022.

References 

Buildings and structures in Seattle
Seattle University campus